Jong-hyun, also spelled Jong-hyeon, is a Korean masculine given name. Its meaning differs based on the hanja used to write each syllable of the name. There are 19 hanja with the reading "jong" and 25 hanja with the reading "hyun" on the South Korean government's official list of hanja which may be registered for use in given names.

People with this name include:

Entertainers
Hong Jong-hyun (born 1990), South Korean actor
 Kim Jong-hyun (1990–2017), South Korean singer, member of boy band Shinee
Lee Jong-hyun (born 1990), South Korean singer and actor, member of rock band CNBLUE
Noh Jong-hyun (born 1993), South Korean actor
Changjo (born Choi Jong-hyun, 1995), South Korean singer, member of South Korean boy band Teen Top
JR (born Kim Jong-hyeon, 1995), South Korean singer, member of South Korean boy band NU'EST

Football players
Kim Jong-hyun (footballer) (born 1973), South Korean football coach and former forward
Sung Jong-hyun (born 1979), South Korean football defender
Lee Jong-hyun (footballer) (born 1987), South Korean football midfielder
Yoo Jong-hyun (born 1988), South Korean football defender
Je Jong-hyun (born 1991), South Korean football goalkeeper
Son Jong-hyun (born 1991), South Korean football midfielder (United Soccer League)

Other sportspeople
Lee Jong-hyun (born 1930), South Korean sport shooter
Pak Jong-hyeon (born 1938), South Korean cyclist
Hwang Jong-hyun (born 1975), South Korean field hockey player
Jang Jong-hyun (born 1984), South Korean field hockey player
Kim Jong-hyun (sport shooter) (born 1985), South Korean sport shooter
Lee Jong-hyun (basketball) (born 1994), South Korean basketball player

See also
List of Korean given names

References

Korean masculine given names